WFAQ-LP (101.3 FM) is a radio station licensed to Mukwonago, Wisconsin, United States. The station is currently owned by Kettle Moraine Community Radio, Inc.

The station features the tagline “The Nation’s Music Source” with programming that is continuous, minimally-interrupted music and occasional DJs. It banks on its vast library (over 100k titles) of independent and local artists and bands collected over 3 decades. The station also features the locally produced Deke Marler “Musictime USNA” program, and in the past, “The Sara Schultz Show”; a politically progressive, Wisconsin-only radio talk show (Sundays 8AM-10AM). They also feature the Suspense radio theatre program, Sundays 8PM-8:30PM.

On November 16, 2014, the station began streaming audio and can be found on the Shoutcast server.

On March 31, 2015, the station changed its broadcasting frequency from 92.9 MHz to 101.3 MHz due to conflicting interference from other stations, notably KATF (92.9 FM, Dubuque, IA). This change was approved by the FCC.

References

External links
 
 

FAQ-LP
FAQ-LP
Waukesha County, Wisconsin
Community radio stations in the United States